Nepotism baby, shortened to nepo baby, is a term referring to the children of celebrities who have succeeded in careers, usually the same, or adjacent, career to their celebrity parents. The implication is that these children are only successful because they have inside access because of their parents due to nepotism.

The term became popular in 2022 when an individual called Meriem Derradji tweeted about Maude Apatow, daughter of director Judd Apatow and actress Leslie Mann, starring in the TV show Euphoria. This led to the term 'nepo baby' trending on TikTok as users pointed out numerous other celebrity nepotism babies. New York Magazine published a list of nepo babies and called 2022 'The Year of the Nepo Baby''.

References

2020s neologisms
Internet slang
Nepotism
Pejorative terms for people